Agyneta maritima is a species of sheet weaver found in Alaska, Canada, Mongolia and Russia. It was described by Emerton in 1919.

References

maritima
Spiders of North America
Spiders of Asia
Spiders of Russia
Spiders described in 1919